Deborah A. Ashenhurst served in the Ohio National Guard for 37 years and now holds a position in the Cabinet of Governor Mike DeWine as the director of the Department Veterans Services. In January 2019, Ashenhurst was appointed as the first female director of the Ohio Department of Veteran Services, which supplies benefits and resources for Ohio's past service members.

Personal life
Ashenhurst grew up in Springfield, Ohio, and Columbus, Ohio, and is now married to James Ashenhurst, who is a retired Army colonel.

Career in National Guard
Ashenhurst first enlisted in the Ohio National Guard in 1978 and has served on 20 different assignments during her service. In 1980 she was commissioned as an Engineer Officer through the Ohio Army Guard's Officer Candidate School. She then served as a reconnaissance officer with the 54th support center. Ashenhurst commanded and held staff officer assignments from battalion, company, brigade, and Joint Force Headquarters. More recent assignments include the commanding general, 73rd Troop Command, commander, 237th personnel Services Battalion, and director, Property and Fiscal Operations, United States Property and Fiscal Office for Ohio. One of her more notable assignments was leading the 73rd Troop Command as a commander. This squad is one of two in the Homeland Response Force, which are trained to respond to any CBRNE incidents east of the Mississippi River. After leading the 73rd Troop Command she was appointed to the role of the first female Adjutant General by Governor John Kasich for the state of Ohio in 2011, and subsequently promoted to the rank of brigadier general. The move was approved by the 133rd General Assembly of the Ohio Legislature. In September 2012, General Ashenhurst was promoted to the rank of major general. After retiring from her role as adjutant general in 2015, General Ashenhurst took on a new position as special assistant to the vice chief in Washington D.C. for the National Guard Bureau. She served under Joseph L. Lengyel, who was the vice chief at the time. Ashenhurst visited Serbia as part of the ongoing National Guard State Partnership Program promoting and coordinating activities between Serbia and Ohio. The United States is rated as one of the most successful cooperation programs of a total of 62 programs. There are 28 members of the ONG specialists with the members of the defense system and the Serbian Interior Ministry. Ashenhurst promoted the first generation of women officers in Serbia with her relations of being the first women to command the Ohio National Guard.

Education
In 1994, Ashenhurst received a Bachelor of Science degree with a concentration in sociology from Regents College (now Excelsior University), part of the University of the State of New York system.  Her professional military education includes completion of the Engineer Officer Basic Course and Medical Officer Advanced Course.  She also graduated from the Military Personnel Officer Course. Ashenhurst completed the Command and General Staff College program by distance learning. In 1995, she completed the Air War College course via distance learning, and in 1999 she completed the Army War College program, also by distance learning.  She also graduated from the Adjutant General Corps Pre-Command Course and Joint Task Force Commander Training Course.

Assignments

Promotions

Officer assigntments

Career in the private sector 
Between her time serving in the United States National Guard and her career in public service, Ashenhurst worked at R2 Associates. She was the senior vice president of Military Strategy during her time there.

Career in public service 
On January 14, 2019, Ashenhurst was appointed as director of Ohio Department of Veterans Services by Governor Mike DeWine. As director she is responsible for leading the agency which provides benefits to Ohio veterans.

Awards and decorations

References

Living people
State cabinet secretaries of Ohio
Ohio National Guard personnel
Year of birth missing (living people)
United States Army War College alumni
University at Albany, SUNY alumni